Transportation refers to transport, the movement of people and goods from place to place.

Transportation may also refer to:

 Penal transportation, the moving of convicted criminals to penal colonies.
 Transportation theory (mathematics), which concerns optimization of transportation and resource allocation.
 Transportation theory (psychology), which concerns psychological immersion in narrative content.
 Sediment transport, the movement of weathered rocks from one place to another.
 Transportation (journal), an academic journal on transportation planning.

See also 
 Transport (disambiguation)
 Transports (disambiguation)